The Entre Ríos Railway (ERR) (in Spanish: Ferrocarril Entre Ríos) was a British-owned railway company that built and operated a   railway network in Entre Ríos Province, between the rivers Uruguay and Paraná, in Argentina.

History
The company began operation in 1892 by purchasing a  rail network operated by state-owned Central Entre Ríos from the provincial government. Four years later the company purchased the  Gualeguay to Puerto Ruiz line, built by "Ferrocarril Primer Entrerriano" in 1866, from the national government, and on 12 October 1899 a  branch line from Gobernador Solá to Macía was opened.

A line from Villaguay to Concordia, on the River Uruguay, was built in 1902 reaching Jubileo on 25 January, General Campos on 3 March and Concordia on 30 June where it joined the Argentine North Eastern Railway. Later the following branch lines were opened: from Las Colas to Enrique Carbó on 10 October 1906, from Caseros to Villa Elisa on 28 December 1906, from Crespo to Hasenkamp on 26 August 1907, from Médanos to Carbó on 1 February 1908, from Médanos to Ibicuy on 15 March 1908, from Ibucuy to the port in 1909, Carbó to Parera on 1 December 1909 and Villa Elisa to San Salvador on 2 July 1912.

In 1915 a joint administration was established with the neighbouring British-owned Argentine North Eastern Railway.

By the time President Juan Perón nationalised Argentina's railways in 1948 the ERR operated a 1,300 km network which became part of the state-owned General Urquiza Railway.

Heritage railway 

In the early 1990s, a heritage railway was opened and operated by "Ferroclub Central Entrerriano", a local non-profit association formed by railway enthusiasts.

See also 
 General Urquiza Railway
 Argentine North Eastern Railway

Bibliography 
 British Railways in Argentina 1857-1914: A Case Study of Foreign Investment by Colin M. Lewis - Athlone Press (for the Institute of Latin American Studies, University of London, 1983)
 British-Owned Railways in Argentina – Their Effect on Economic Nationalism, 1854-1948 by Winthrop R. Wright ( Latin American Monograph No. 34, Institute of Latin American Studies), Univ. of Texas Press (London, 1974)

References

External links
 

Defunct railway companies of Argentina
Railway companies established in 1892
Railway companies disestablished in 1948
Standard gauge railways in Argentina
Transport in Entre Ríos Province